Stella Park is a housing estate in Blaydon-on-Tyne, Tyne and Wear, England, located on the grounds of a mansion of the same name.

Stella Hall
In the 12th century a Bishop of Durham, William of St. Barbara, granted Stellinglei to the nuns of Newcastle, and it remained a nunnery until the Dissolution of the Monasteries under King Henry VIII.

Stella Hall belonged to the Lords Widdrington in the 17th and 18th centuries. In 1792, it was inherited by John Towneley, whose mother was Mary, daughter of the 3rd Baron Widdrington. Its descent then followed that of the main Towneley Park estate near Burnley, Lancashire, to John's son Peregrine Towneley and was recorded as a property of 281 acres belonging to him in 1848. The Hall was later the home of Joseph Cowen, and is believed to have been purchased by his father, the newspaper and coal millionaire Sir Joseph Cowen, around 1850. However, in 1878, on the death of Peregrine's son, also called John Towneley, 2,826 acres, probably formerly part of this estate, was distributed between his daughters.

The Hall remained in the Cowen family until Jane Cowen's death in 1946. It was briefly owned by the University of Durham before being demolished in 1954.

See also
 Stella power stations

References

History of Tyne and Wear
Country houses in Tyne and Wear
Geography of Tyne and Wear
Housing estates in England